Shady XV (stylized as SH∀DYXV) is a hip hop compilation album performed by various artists of Shady Records. The double disc album was released on November 24, 2014, by Shady Records and Interscope Records. The album was released in honor of the label's 15th anniversary and as its 15th project (excluding Eminem's solo releases). The compilation consists of two discs, the first featuring new material from Shady Records artists such as Slaughterhouse, Bad Meets Evil, D12 and Yelawolf, as well as the label's founder Eminem. The second disc includes the label's greatest hits, also featuring former Shady Records members. All previous and current members of the label are represented on the album.

Release and promotion
On June 3, 2014, Eminem's manager and Shady Records co-founder Paul Rosenberg tweeted "Shady XV". On August 23, 2014, during his final stop of The Monster Tour with Rihanna at Detroit, Michigan's Comerica Park, Eminem wore a T-shirt branded "Shady XV". On August 25, 2014, he tweeted "Yes it's official... #SHADYXV Black Friday," leading to speculation about a release on Black Friday, which fell on November 28, 2014. He also released a 20-second teaser video, featuring images of Eminem and other Shady Records artists. On the same day, August 25, a press release was issued on Eminem's official website, announcing that Shady XV, a two-disc compilation featuring a collection of Shady Records' greatest hits on one disc and new material from Eminem, Slaughterhouse, Bad Meets Evil, D12, and Yelawolf on the other, was set to release on November 24, 2014, in the week of Black Friday.

On October 13, 2014, Eminem posted a video on various social media websites of the artwork, along with the description "Back to basics! Here's the cover for #SHADYXV out 11/24." The cover depicts a black and red hockey mask under two crossed chainsaws.

The album was released on disc and as a digital download on November 24, 2014 as the 15th release on the label (excluding Eminem's solo releases) and 15 years after its inception. The "greatest hits" disc contains tracks by current Shady Records members, as well as previous members 50 Cent, Obie Trice, Bobby Creekwater, Ca$his and Stat Quo. The track list was revealed on October 29, 2014 on the official website.

A rap cypher with Eminem, Slaughterhouse, and Yelawolf, titled 'SHADY CXVPHER', premiered on Vevo on November 10, 2014 to promote the album. On November 18, 2014, Eminem revealed info about the "Lose Yourself" demo version, the last track on the second disc. It contains alternate lyrics to the original beat that were recorded but never published. Eminem had no memory of this scrapped version until he was recently reminded.

Music and lyrics
"Guts Over Fear" is about Eminem and his struggles as an artist, and touches up on moments of his career. "Detroit vs. Everybody" is a posse cut which features Eminem and fellow Detroit natives Royce da 5'9", Big Sean, Danny Brown, Trick-Trick, and Dej Loaf rapping over a boom bap beat.

Singles
The first single, "Guts Over Fear", which features vocals by Australian singer-songwriter Sia and production from Emile Haynie, was previewed in the trailer for the film The Equalizer, released on June 16, 2014 (with its title not yet revealed). A TV spot for the film was released on August 24, 2014, and aired during the 2014 MTV Video Music Awards, at the end of which it was promoted as "featuring the new song Eminem feat. Sia 'Guts Over Fear' from Shady XV - Black Friday". The song was a new leak before it was released a day later on the iTunes Store. It was later confirmed that the track would also roll during the closing credits of The Equalizer.
The second single, "Y'all Ready Know" by Slaughterhouse, was released on November 4, 2014. The music video was released the same day. The third and last single, "Detroit vs. Everybody" by Eminem, Trick-Trick, Dej Loaf, Big Sean, Royce Da 5'9", and Danny Brown, premiered on Eminem's radio channel Shade 45 on November 10, 2014. It was officially released on iTunes later that night.

Critical reception

Shady XV received generally positive reviews from music critics. At Metacritic, which assigns a normalized rating out of 100 to reviews from critics, the album received an average score of 61, which indicates "generally favorable reviews", based on 9 reviews. Samantha O'Connor of Exclaim! said, "For the Shady diehard fans, Shady XV is enough. But for those searching for that nostalgic surge of adrenaline-inducing passion and innovative content reminiscent of the Shady reign, it's better to skip the new material and head straight to the classics." Kyle Anderson of Entertainment Weekly said, "Shady's first half is, like most new Eminem material, more problematic but also more rewarding. With its aggro-horrorcore production, trapped-in-2001 cultural nods (there's a reference to former congressman Gary Condit), and Billy Squier sample, it's essentially The Marshall Mathers LP 2.5, with all the accompanying dicey gender politics."

Homer Johnsen of HipHopDX said, "Some songs border on perfection. A few more are just solidly average. Yet, it all balances out, and the rhymes on full display make Shady XV a great compilation release."

Commercial performance
The album debuted at number three on the Billboard 200 chart, with first-week sales of 138,000 copies in the United States. In its second week, the album dropped to number 21 on the chart, selling 28,000 copies. In its third week, the album dropped to number 37 on the chart, selling 18,000 copies. In its fourth week the album dropped to number 54 on the chart, selling 17,000 copies. As of June 27, 2015, Shady XV has been certified gold by the Recording Industry Association of America for shipping more than half-million units (in this case, 250,000 copies double album sets, which are double-counted by the RIAA).

Track listing

Notes
 signifies a co-producer.
 signifies an additional producer.

Sample credits
"Shady XV" contains elements of "My Kinda Lover", written and performed by Billy Squier. Contains elements of "Fack" and "The Monster" performed by Eminem.
”Die Alone” interpolates “Just So You Don’t Die Alone”, written and performed by Luis Resto.
"Down" contains elements of "Going Down", written by Don Nix and performed by Freddie King.
"Twisted" contains elements of "Synthetic Substitution", written by Herb Rooney and performed by Melvin Bliss.
"Detroit vs. Everybody" contains elements of "Funky Drummer", written and performed by James Brown, and "Static on the Frequency", written by Peter Beveridge, Andy James and Jon Trotti and performed by Peter Beveridge.
"I Get Money" contains elements of "Top Billin'", written by Kirk Robinson and performed by Audio Two.
"Cry Now" contains elements of "Blind Man", written by Joseph Scott and Don Robey, and performed by Bobby "Blue" Bland.
"Hammer Dance" contains elements of "Falling Away from Me", written by Jonathan Davis, Reginald Arvizu, James Shaffer, David Silveria and Brian Welch, and performed by Korn.
"Wanna Know" contains elements of "It Couldn't Be Me", written by William Jones and Dennis Webber and performed by Power of Zeus.

Charts

Weekly charts

Year-end charts

Certifications

See also
List of Billboard number-one R&B/Hip-Hop albums of 2014
List of number-one albums of 2014 (Canada)

References

2014 greatest hits albums
2014 compilation albums
Eminem compilation albums
Albums produced by Dr. Dre
Albums produced by DJ Premier
Albums produced by Eminem
Albums produced by Emile Haynie
Record label compilation albums
Shady Records compilation albums
Hip hop compilation albums
Albums produced by DJ Khalil
Albums produced by John Hill (record producer)
Albums produced by Boi-1da
Albums produced by Just Blaze
Albums produced by Statik Selektah